This is a list of the National Register of Historic Places listings in Franklin County, Nebraska.  It is intended to be a complete list of the properties and districts on the National Register of Historic Places in Franklin County, Nebraska, United States.  The locations of National Register properties and districts for which the latitude and longitude coordinates are included below, may be seen in an online map.

There are 4 properties and districts listed on the National Register in the county, and three former listings.

Current listings

|}

Former listings

|}

See also
 List of National Historic Landmarks in Nebraska
 National Register of Historic Places listings in Nebraska

References

 
Franklin